The Eldorado Mountains, also called the El Dorado Mountains, are a north-south trending mountain range in southeast Nevada bordering  west of the south-flowing Colorado River; the endorheic Eldorado Valley borders the range to the west, and the range is also on the western border of the Colorado River's Black Canyon of the Colorado, and El Dorado Canyon on the river.

The name El Dorado is taken from the name of a legendary gold mine, and the ghost town-mining location of Nelson in Nelson Canyon, transects the central portion of the range. The Nelson Overlook is a viewing point over the Colorado River's El Dorado Canyon.

Wilderness
Established in 2004, the area is jointly managed by the NPS and the BLM. The NPS manages the eastern section within the Lake Mead National Recreation Area and the BLM manages the western section.

This desert wilderness is a rugged maze of hills, peaks, and winding canyons. The Eldorado Range is volcanic rock with basalt flows on a base of metamorphic rock. A bajada extends northwest of the mountains. Creosote bush, scrub oak, clump grass, and various cacti cover the mountains and foothills. This supports a significant population of bighorn sheep in the higher elevations. Abandoned mine sites are scattered among the region. Water is scarce, besides the Colorado River, and summer temperatures can reach 120 °F (48 °C).

Some communities associated with the range, are in the south, Searchlight on US 95 and Cottonwood Cove, on the river. Nelson is in the center of the range, and the nearest community north is Boulder City.

References

External links
 
 Eldorado Wilderness – NPS
 El Dorado Wilderness at birdandhike.com
  Ireteba Wilderness at birdandhike.com

Lake Mead National Recreation Area
Mountain ranges of Nevada
Mountain ranges of the Mojave Desert
Mountain ranges of the Lower Colorado River Valley
Eldorado Valley
Mountain ranges of Clark County, Nevada